Donald Eric Stanley (born 8 March 1972) is an English former first-class cricketer.

Stanley was born at Bromley in March 1972. He was educated at Abingdon School, before going up to Caius College, Cambridge. While studying at Cambridge, he played first-class cricket for Cambridge University Cricket Club in 1994 and 1995, making seven appearances. Playing as a middle order batsman in five matches in 1994 and as an opening batsman in two matches in 1995, he scored 101 runs at an average of 10.10; almost half of his career runs came in a single innings, with a score of 48 against Glamorgan in 1994.

References

External links

1972 births
Living people
People from Bromley
People educated at Abingdon School
Alumni of Gonville and Caius College, Cambridge
English cricketers
Cambridge University cricketers